Tauno Lampola (8 December 1903 – 12 April 1969) was a Finnish modern pentathlete. He competed at the 1928 Summer Olympics.

References

External links
 

1903 births
1969 deaths
Finnish male modern pentathletes
Olympic modern pentathletes of Finland
Modern pentathletes at the 1928 Summer Olympics
People from Kokkola
Sportspeople from Central Ostrobothnia